Netechma saccata is a species of moth of the family Tortricidae. It is found in Peru.

The wingspan is 17 mm. The ground colour of the forewings is white with some grey strigulae (fine streaks) in the postmedian half of the wing and black costal spots. The hindwings are cream, but darker posteriorly and whiter basally.

Etymology
The species name refers to the presence of a sac of the corpus bursae.

References

Moths described in 2010
Netechma